Remixed Affairs is the second album and first remix album by the Danish dance/house act Infernal, released in 1998 in Denmark. It contains two complete new tracks aside from six remixes, two live tracks and a megamix.

Track listing
"Destruction" [vocal version] – 3:30
"Du Gamle Måne" – 3:42
"Groove Child" – 9:22
"Voodoo Cowboy" [Infernal's radio club mix] – 3:45
"Sorti de L'enfer" [Harmonika radio mix] – 3:49
"Your Crown" [Pasta People's Whirl It Up mix] – 8:37
"Highland Fling" [DJ Rainbow mix] – 7:17
"Voodoo Cowboy" [Aliens Ate My C-C-Countryclub mix] – 6:44
"Disk Jockey Polka" [live] – 6:17
"Kalinka" [live] – 8:15
"Re-Tape's Infernal Megamix" – 5:06

References

Infernal (Danish band) albums
1998 remix albums